The March-BMW M1/C, also known as the BMW-March M1/C, or simply the March 81P, was an IMSA GTX/GTP sports prototype race car, designed, developed, and built by British constructor March Engineering, in collaboration with German manufacturer BMW, for sports car racing, in 1981. It was a highly modified version of the BMW M1 sports car.

References

External links

Racing cars
BMW racing cars
March vehicles
Sports prototypes
IMSA GTP cars